Oxtail stew dishes are a traditional item in various cuisines.

 Coda alla vaccinara is a modern Roman cuisine stew made with oxtail.
 Rabo de toro is a traditional Spanish oxtail stew.
 Kare-kare is a meat, tripe, oxtail and vegetables in peanut sauce stew in Filipino cuisine customarily served with bagoong alamang (shrimp paste). 
 Maafe is an African oxtail stew.

Oxtail stew is a traditional Lesothian cuisine dish.  Laotian feu can be made with oxtail. Oxtail ragout is eaten in Italy. In the U.S., Clifton's Cafeteria served oxtail stew.

See also
 List of stews
Oxtail soup

References

Offal
Meat stews